Anna Huttenlocher is an American rheumatologist and physician-scientist known for her work in cell migration and wound healing.

Early life and education
Huttenlocher was born to two academic parents; her father, Peter, was a pediatric neurologist and her mother, Janellen, was a psychologist. She completed her Bachelor of Science degree at Oberlin College and her medical degree from Harvard Medical School. Following Harvard, she completed her training at Boston Children's Hospital and the University of California, San Francisco.

Career
Huttenlocher joined the faculty at the University of Wisconsin–Madison (UW-M) in 1999 with a joint appointment in the Departments of Pediatrics and Pharmacology and as an associate director of the Medical Scientist Training Program (MSTP). While serving in this role, Huttenlocher focused her research on defining the cellular and molecular mechanisms that regulate cell migration and identifying the basic adhesive mechanisms that regulate cell migration and leukocyte chemotaxis. By 2005, her research team had identified a novel pathway that turned out to be critical for cell migration and chemotaxis as it involves intracellular proteolysis by the calcium-dependent protease calpain. As a result, she was also elected a member of the American Society for Clinical Investigation. Following this discovery, Huttenlocher was promoted to Professor with tenure and was the recipient of the Graduate School’s H.I. Romnes Fellowship award. She also received the Burroughs-Wellcome Fund’s Clinical Scientist Award in Translational Research for her project "Diagnosis and Treatment of Autoinflammatory Disease."

As a result of her research, Huttenlocher was the recipient of a 2011 WARF Kellett Mid-Career Award. In 2012, Huttenlocher was appointed the director of the MSTP, succeeding a retiring Deane Mosher. During this time, she was also elected into the Association of American Physicians and became a Member of the National Academy of Medicine "for her pioneering studies of cell migration and alterations of cell migration in human diseases." In 2017, Huttenlocher was awarded a UW2020 grant to support her project "Engineering leukocytes generated from human iPS cells to treat human disease." At the same time, she was also elected a Fellow of the American Society for Cell Biology.

In May 2020, Huttenlocher was named the Anna Ruth Brummett Professor of Pediatrics and Medical Microbiology and Immunology Chair in honor of her "major contributions to the advancement of knowledge." The following year, she was one of eight researchers recognized with the Society for the Immunotherapy of Cancer’s Team Science Award as someone who has "made a long-standing contribution to the field of cancer immunotherapy over the past 35 years." Huttenlocher later started a research project entitled "Cell migration and wound repair" and "Imaging Immunometabolism in live animals during host defense."

References

External links

Living people
American molecular biologists
American women scientists
Women molecular biologists
Members of the National Academy of Medicine
Oberlin College alumni
Harvard Medical School alumni
Year of birth missing (living people)
Fellows of the American Society for Cell Biology
Members of the American Society for Clinical Investigation
21st-century American women